Undō-Kōen Station (運動公園駅) is the name of two train stations in Japan:

 Undō-Kōen Station (Gunma)
 Undōkōen Station (Miyazaki)